Llagunoa is a genus of flowering plants belonging to the family Sapindaceae.

Its native range is Southern America. It is found in the countries of Bolivia, Chile, Colombia, Ecuador, Peru and Venezuela.
 
The genus name of Llagunoa is in honour of Eugenio de Llaguno y Amírola (1724–1799), a Spanish politician and writer. 
It was first described and published in Fl. Peruv. Prodr. on page 126 in 1794.

Known species
According to Kew:
Llagunoa glandulosa 
Llagunoa nitida 
Llagunoa venezuelana

References

Sapindaceae
Sapindaceae genera
Plants described in 1794
Flora of western South America
Flora of Venezuela
Flora of central Chile